The Prime Minister's Official Residence is the official workplace and residence of the Prime Minister of Japan.

Located at 2-3-1 Nagata-chō, Chiyoda-ku, Tokyo 100–8968, it is diagonally adjacent to the National Diet Building. The term Kantei is used as a metonym for the office of the Prime Minister of Japan and for the Prime Minister's advisors and administration in general.

In addition to being the principal office and residence of the Prime Minister, the building also serves as the principal office of the Chief Cabinet Secretary and their Deputy, the location of Cabinet meetings, and is also the location of a national crisis management center.

History

First Residence
With the evolution of a national parliament after the Meiji Restoration and the establishment of the post of "Prime Minister of Japan" in 1885, the need for an official prime ministerial residence was felt. On the encouragement of Prime Minister Tanaka Giichi, the first residence was completed on 18 March 1929. It incorporates architectural styles such as Art Deco and expressionist architecture which became popular from the late Taishō period to the early Shōwa period. It was heavily influenced by the architecture of Frank Lloyd Wright, in particular his design for the second Tokyo Imperial Hotel. It is a two-storied mansion designed by Muraji Shimomoto, of the Ministry of the Treasury (now Ministry of Finance). Prime Minister Tanaka is said to have exclaimed, "This is just like a café, isn't it?", upon seeing the building.

By the 1990s, the old  building was deemed cramped and insufficient. It underwent seismic retrofitting and internal renovation.

Second Residence
A new five-storied residence was built in 2002 next to the old residence, with 2.5 times the floor space. Installed with solar panels and a rainwater storage system, the new building has been designed to minimize environmental impact. The new residence went into service in April 2002

In an April 2015 incident, a Phantom 2 drone carrying traces of radiation was found on the roof of the PM's office.

Notes

External links

 Prime Minister of Japan and His Cabinet
 Official YouTube Channel
 A virtual tour of the Kantei (Prime Minister's Official Residence)
 A virtual tour of the former Kantei (Prime Minister's Official Residence)

Official residences in Japan
Buildings and structures in Chiyoda, Tokyo
Prime ministerial residences
Government buildings completed in 1929
Houses completed in 1929
Government buildings completed in 2002
Houses completed in 2002
2002 establishments in Japan
Prime Ministers of Japan